Robert Cooper Allen Wright (20 February 1913 – 27 May 1998) was a Scottish footballer who played as a left half. He made over 20 Football League appearances in the years before the Second World War.

Career
Wright played locally for Horden Colliery Welfare; he signed for Charlton Athletic in May 1937 for £100. He made 28 appearances for Charlton before the Second World War. Wright spent much of the war abroad but did make 47 wartime appearances for Charlton and 19 for Middlesbrough. Wright retired from playing in 1947.

Wright became assistant manager to Jimmy Seed at Charlton Athletic in September 1947. He was appointed Bristol City manager in April 1949. He complained that he was not given a free hand by the Bristol City board of directors and resigned in June 1950. He was a licensee in Bristol until joining Bristol Rovers as assistant manager to Bert Tann in July 1951 leaving that post again in July 1952. He became the licensee of the "White Hart" in Lower Maudlin Street, Bristol.

References

1913 births
1998 deaths
Footballers from Glasgow
Scottish footballers
Association football wing halves
English Football League players
Charlton Athletic F.C. players
Bristol City F.C. managers
Scottish football managers
Middlesbrough F.C. wartime guest players
British military personnel of World War II